The term Sánchez government may refer to:

First government of Pedro Sánchez, the government of Spain under Pedro Sánchez from 2018 to 2020.
Second government of Pedro Sánchez, the government of Spain under Pedro Sánchez from 2020.